Tanakia himantegus is a species of fishes in the family Cyprinidae found in China and Taiwan.

Subspecies
T. h. chii (Paratanakia himantegus chii) (Miao, 1934):China mainland and Taiwan
T. h. himantegus (Paratanakia himantegus himantegus) (Günther, 1868):Taiwan

References

Tanakia
Taxa named by Albert Günther
Fish described in 1868